Aana Marutha is mythological figure popular in Kerala state of India. Aana Marutha is often depicted as a bloodsucking evil spirit. She is known for her lusty quest and erotic pranks.

See also

Yakshi
Karuthachan
Muthappan

References

Indian legendary creatures
Kerala folklore
Female legendary creatures
Mythological hematophages